Mary Ellen Elizabeth Turpel-Lafond  (born February 1963) is a Canadian lawyer, former judge, and legislative advocate for children's rights.

She was appointed in 2006 as British Columbia's first Representative for Children and Youth, an independent position reporting to the Legislative Assembly. She was re-appointed to a second five-year term in 2011. Turpel-Lafond has claimed to be the first Treaty Indian to be appointed to the Provincial Court of Saskatchewan as she claimed her father was Cree. This claim to be a Treaty Indian has been disputed, however. Time Magazine has twice bestowed honours upon Turpel-Lafond, naming her as one of the "100 Global Leaders of Tomorrow" in 1994, and in 1999 as one of the "Top 20 Canadian Leaders for the 21st Century". She has been invested into the Order of Canada, and was until 2022 celebrated as among the most accomplished First Nations scholars in the history of Canada.

After an October 2022 CBC News investigation found major discrepancies in biographical claims made by Turpel-Lafond about Indigenous ancestry, educational credentials, and legal accomplishments, her career came under heightened public scrutiny.

Early life and education

Place of birth
Turpel-Lafond's place of birth is disputed.

According to several interviews given by Turpel-Lafond between 2007 and 2019, as well as testimony she provided to the Senate of Canada, she was born and raised on the First Nation reserve of the Norway House Cree Nation, in Manitoba.

According to CBC News, Turpel-Lafond was more likely born and raised in Niagara Falls, Ontario. The CBC's claim is based on archival voter records that show Turpel-Lafond's parents were registered to vote in Niagara Falls during both the year of her birth and the year prior to her birth; a yearbook for a Niagara Falls high school that lists Turpel-Lafond as a student 14 years later; the 1996 edition of Who's Who in Canada – which was edited by Turpel-Lafond – lists her place of birth as Niagara Falls; her ex-husband's statement that, during the period of their marriage, he understood her to have been born and raised in Niagara Falls, and had seen her birth certificate when they were preparing for marriage. CBC also reported that former Norway House Cree Nation chief and band councillor Ron Evans, who lived at Norway House during the time Turpel-Lafond was supposedly born there, said he has no recollection of any families with the surname Turpel living in the tight-knit community.

Ancestry
Turpel-Lafond's ancestry and ethnicity are disputed.

According to a post made by Turpel-Lafond to her Twitter account, she is "of Cree, Scottish and English heritage"; Cree via her father, and Scottish and English via her mother. That post also claims that her father, William Turpel, “was Cree, spoke Cree and lived the values of a Cree person.” Turpel-Lafond asserts that her father was adopted by a British couple as a child, William Nicholson Turpel and Eleanor Rhoda Turpel, but the adoption was done informally leaving no documentary records or evidence.

The CBC reports that a birth certificate, baptismal record, and newspaper birth announcement all show that Turpel-Lafond's father, William, was actually the biological child of Canadian-British couple William Nicholson Turpel and Eleanor Rhoda Turpel. In an analysis of historical records undertaken at the request of the CBC by Wilfrid Laurier University professor Mark Humphries, who specializes in early Canadian social history, Humphries concluded it was "unlikely" Turpel-Lafond's father, William, was adopted as she claims. A cousin and an aunt of Turpel-Lafond have both told reporters that they had never known William Turpel to have either been adopted or have been of Cree ancestry. Asked to comment on Turpel-Lafond's claim that her father is Cree, her ex-husband has said that "she's constructed a whole bunch of things". Joe Keeper, a Cree man born at Norway House at around the same time William Turpel was born, has told media that neither he nor anyone he knows had heard that William Turpel was Cree and he doubts the accuracy of such a claim.

Education and honoraria
By age 18, Turpel-Lafond had entered Carleton University, Ottawa, gravitating from the study of math and science to politics, philosophy, and eventually the law. Turpel-Lafond received a bachelor of arts degree from Carleton University in 1982, a law degree from Osgoode Hall in 1985, and a doctorate of law from Harvard Law School in 1997.

Turpel-Lafond received a diploma in international law from the University of Cambridge in 1989. In a 2018 curriculum vitae, she claimed to have received a Master of Laws (LLM) from Cambridge. According to Turpel-Lafond, a diploma in law is "equivalent to a master’s degree in law". Sarah Eaton, a University of Calgary professor who specializes in academic integrity, has challenged that claim.  When asked by reporters, the University of Cambridge confirmed that the diploma is a substantially different credential from the LL.M. degree.

In 2014, she was awarded an honorary doctorate from McGill University and gave the commencement address to the graduating law class.

Turpel-Lafond claims to have received an honorary doctorate from First Nations University of Canada. According to First Nations University of Canada, it has never granted an honorary degree in the history of the institution and "any mention of receiving an honorary degree or award from FNUniv is erroneous".

Turpel-Lafond claims to have received the designation of Queen's Counsel (Q.C.) by the Government of Saskatchewan. Both the Ministry of Justice of Saskatchewan and the Law Society of Saskatchewan report there is no record of Turpel-Lafond being made Q.C.

On December 14, 2022, the CBC reported that "All eleven universities that have granted honorary degrees to Turpel-Lafond have publicly committed to review the matter in some form."

Turpel-Lafond returned the honorary doctorate granted her in 2013 by Vancouver Island University (VIU), the university said on January 17, 2023. In a statement the university said "Turpel-Lafond informed VIU of her decision to voluntarily return the honour after receiving correspondence from the university that it would be moving forward with a process regarding her honorary doctorate," the statement said. The university said that it would have no further comment about Turpel-Lafond, although it quoted VIU president Deborah Saucier as saying, "false claims of Indigenous ancestry cause harm to Indigenous peoples."

On February 7, 2023, Royal Roads University revealed that Turpel-Lafond had surrendered an honorary Doctor of Laws degree that she had received in 2016. In a published statement, the university explained that Turpel-Lafond had responded to an investigation by voluntarily relinquishing the degree, which was then promptly cancelled. Royal Roads acknowledged the "harm caused to Indigenous people and communities by controversies such as these."

On February 13, 2023, the University of Regina revoked the honorary doctorate it had awarded to Turpel-Lafond in 2003. "While the University recognizes that Turpel-Lafond has been a strong advocate for Indigenous rights and child welfare, her accomplishments are outweighed by the harm inflicted upon Indigenous academics, peoples and communities when non-Indigenous people misrepresent their Indigenous ancestry," the university said in a statement. The university went on to say "it made the decision following consultation and a review of evidence published by the media related to her ancestry claims and 'a number of other stated credentials and academic achievements have been shown to be untrue."

Carleton University, on 24 February, 2023, rescinded the honorary degree awarded to Turpel-Lafond by Carleton in 2019, stating "The evidence that emerged about disputed claims to both Indigenous identity and academic credentials/accolades was deemed to outweigh the accomplishments that originally warranted granting the degree." On the same date, the McGill University senate voted to revoke the honorary degree bestowed upon Turpel-Lafond by McGill in 2014, citing "evidence calling into question the validity of information about academic credentials and accomplishments appearing on Ms. Turpel-Lafond’s curriculum vitae," and "that her claims about being a Treaty Indian were the subject of important questions."

Career

Until recently, Mary Ellen Turpel-Lafond was celebrated as among the most accomplished First Nations scholars in the history of Canada.

While claiming to be a member of the Muskeg Lake Cree Nation, Turpel-Lafond was thought to be the first Treaty Indian to be appointed a judge in Saskatchewan in 1998. She was the administrative judge for Saskatoon, involved in the administration of the Provincial Court of Saskatchewan in relation to access to justice, judicial independence projects, technology and public outreach.

As a criminal law judge in youth and adult courts, Turpel-Lafond worked at developing partnerships to better serve the needs of young people in the justice system, particularly sexually exploited children and youth, and children and youth with disabilities, such as fetal alcohol spectrum disorder.

Prior to her judicial appointment, Turpel-Lafond was a lawyer in Nova Scotia and Saskatchewan. She was an assistant professor of law at Dalhousie University Faculty of Law from 1989 to 1996. She occasionally spoke at other universities, and held the position of Aboriginal Scholar at the University of Saskatchewan. She has been a visiting professor at the University of British Columbia and the University of Victoria law schools.

In November 2006, Turpel-Lafond was appointed to a five-year term as British Columbia's first Representative for Children and Youth. Her responsibilities included advocating for children and youth, protecting their rights, and improving the system for their protection and support, particularly those who are most vulnerable. She served all British Columbians under the age of 19, with an emphasis on young people in government care – such as those in foster homes, group homes, or youth custody.

Turpel-Lafond was appointed to a second term in late 2011. In 2015, she called for the government to hire immediately at least 250 social workers for indigenous children, in order to provide needed services and protect vulnerable children. She said that due to turnover, government hiring had resulted in a minor increase in the number of social workers to care for children.

As a practising lawyer, Turpel-Lafond has appeared before all levels of courts in Canada, including the Supreme Court of Canada. Turpel-Lafond has worked on land claims with the Indian Law Resource Center in Washington, D.C., and served as a key legal and constitutional adviser to aboriginal leaders. Around 2017 she was being mooted as a potential first Indigenous appointment to the Supreme Court of Canada.

According to Turpel-Lafond, she co-authored a book with University of British Columbia professor Grant Charles in 2017 titled Indigenous Customary Adoption and Reconciliation. Charles says he has no recollection of writing such a book, and no copies of the claimed volume have ever been discovered.

In 2017, Turpel-Lafond filed a lawsuit against the Province of British Columbia which claimed that the government broke a verbal agreement to provide her with 18 months worth of pension credits for each year of service. The statement of claim said the province had a history of animosity with Turpel-Lafond. It says a deputy minister told her in 2015 that "the government would treat her as a 'member of the opposition.'"

University of British Columbia

In 2018, Turpel-Lafond joined the Peter A. Allard School of Law at the University of British Columbia (UBC) as professor and was subsequently named the inaugural director of the University of British Columbia's Indian Residential School History and Dialogue Centre. She resigned as director in June 2022, while continuing as a professor at the university.

On January 3, 2023 it was reported that Turpel-Lafond was as of December 16, 2022 no longer employed by the University of British Columbia. Turpel-Lafond's departure from UBC was marked by controversy, with her stating that she "retired" from her position, a claim which UBC declined to confirm. The Globe and Mail states that Turpel-Lafond was removed from her position at the Peter A. Allard School of Law "because of the compelling evidence that she isn't who she says she is."

Reactions to ancestry issue

In 2022, after allegations emerged that Turpel-Lafond had falsely claimed indigenous ancestry, UBC affirmed its support for her with a university spokesperson saying indigenous ancestry was not a prerequisite for her employment and that Turpel-Lafond's "identity is her own and the university is not going to comment on it". Grand Chief Stewart Phillip, president of the Union of British Columbia Indian Chiefs, said he supported Turpel-Lafond and denounced accusations against her as a "disgusting witch hunt", and as "Garbage. Yellow journalism. Tabloid crap. Misogynistic!!".  Some Indigenous groups and individuals also offered support to Turpel-Lafond.

The Indigenous Women's Collective, which includes Lillian Dyck, the first woman of First Nations ancestry to serve in Canada's Senate, criticized the university's response saying that "university leaders have been too swift to publicly defend an individual claiming to hold Treaty Indian status and Indigeneity, when in fact there is no verifiable evidence to support that claim".  The Collective has also called on universities which have granted honorary degrees to Turpel-Lafond to consider revoking them.  Some universities have indicated that they are reviewing the issue.

Aly Bear, vice chief of the Federation of Sovereign Indigenous Nations, initially joined a statement of support for Turpel-Lafond.  She subsequently retracted her support, explaining that her statement was issued "prematurely" and that she found Turpel-Lafond's claims of Cree ancestry "extremely offensive".

Cindy Blackstock, professor of social work at McGill University, executive director of the First Nations Child and Family Caring Society, and member of the Gitxsan First Nation, has stated that she had reserved judgment on the issue until further evidence came out. She has concluded that the birth certificate for Turpel-Lafond's father "... was pretty clear and convincing evidence suggesting that in this case there is no Indigenous identity per se".

Turpel-Lafond is a practising member of the Law Society of British Columbia, having been admitted to the BC Bar since 2018. She was a partner at Lafond & Mack Law Group LLP but the firm was dissolved on October 19, 2022, a week after the allegations surfaced on CBC.  She is now practising as a sole practitioner-lawyer.

Personal life

Turpel-Lafond lives in North Saanich, British Columbia, with her second husband George Lafond, who is a former vice-chief and tribal chief of the Saskatoon Tribal Council. They have a son and three daughters, including one set of twins.

References

External links
 BC Representative for Children and Youth

1963 births
Living people
People from Niagara Falls, Ontario
Lawyers in Saskatchewan
Cree people
Canadian women lawyers
Judges in Saskatchewan
Canadian women judges
First Nations judges
Harvard Law School alumni
Carleton University alumni
Osgoode Hall Law School alumni
Alumni of the University of Cambridge
Officers of the Order of Canada
People from the Capital Regional District
People stripped of honorary degrees